Aktia Bank Plc is a Finnish asset manager, bank and life insurer with offices in the Helsinki, Turku, Tampere, Vaasa and Oulu regions.  

Aktia has three business areas: Banking, Asset Management and Life Insurance. Aktia has three reporting business segments: Banking Business, Asset Management and Group Functions. 

Aktia has about 250,000 private customers and 20,000 corporate and institutional customers.

Aktia is owned by Finnish savings bank foundations, institutions and private individuals.

The name Aktia is derived from the Greek language word akti, which means coast. Aktia used to serve as the central financial institute for savings and local co-operative banks.

History 
Aktia originated from the oldest deposit bank in Finland, founded in 1825 as Helsingfors Stads Sparbanks Inrättning. In 1891 the bank changed its name to Helsingfors Sparbank (Helsinki Savings Bank). 

Some banks that have merged with Aktia include: Kirkkonummen Säästöpankki in 1956, Säästöpankki Torkkeli in 1979 and Espoon Säästöpankki in 1980.

Aktia attained its current form in 1991, when the savings bank of Bromarv, Hanko, Ingå, Karjaa-Pohja, Sipoo, Siuntio, and Tenala merged to form Säästöpankki Aktia (Savings Bank Aktia). Later, the savings banks of Porvoo and Vaasa were merged. The name was changed to Aktia Säästöpankki Oy (Aktia Savings Bank Oy) in 1994. In 1996, Aktia acquired the retail banking operations of SKOP Bank (fi), which went bust in the early-1990s Finnish banking crisis and the recession that followed. 

The Annual General Meeting in the spring of 2018 decided to merge Aktia's share series: previously the shares were divided into A and R series, of which each R share entitles the holder to 20 votes and each A share to one vote at the Annual General Meeting.

References

Banks of Finland
Banks established in 1991
Companies listed on Nasdaq Helsinki
Finnish companies established in 1991